Tobias Kraulich (born 24 March 1999) is a German footballer who plays as a defender for 3. Liga club SV Meppen.

Career
After his beginnings in the youth of SV Empor Erfurt, Kraulich moved to the youth department of Rot-Weiß Erfurt in the summer of 2014. There, he also made his professional debut in the 3. Liga, when on 16 March 2018 he was in the starting lineup in the 2–4 away loss to SV Wehen Wiesbaden.

On 10 July 2020, Würzburger Kickers announced that Kraulich had signed a two-year contract with the club.

Kraulich joined 3. Liga club SV Meppen following Würzburger Kickers' relegation to the Regionalliga Bayern in the 2021–22 season. He signed a two-year contract on 29 August 2022.

References

External links
 Profile at FuPa.net

1999 births
Living people
Sportspeople from Erfurt
Footballers from Thuringia
German footballers
Association football defenders
FC Rot-Weiß Erfurt players
1. FC Nürnberg II players
Würzburger Kickers players
SV Meppen players
2. Bundesliga players
3. Liga players
Regionalliga players